South Korea competed at the 2013 Summer Universiade in Kazan, Russia from 6 July to 17 July 2013. 238 athletes are a part of the Korean team.

South Korea has won 41 medals (6th place), including 17 gold medals (4th place after Russia, China, Japan).

References

Nations at the 2013 Summer Universiade
2013